José Salvador Esquer Bisbal (born 8 January 1969) is a Spanish handball player who competed in the 1996 Summer Olympics.

He was born in Algemesí.

In 1996 he was a member of the Spanish handball team which won the bronze medal. He played all seven matches and scored 21 goals.

External links
profile

1969 births
Living people
Spanish male handball players
Olympic handball players of Spain
Handball players at the 1996 Summer Olympics
Olympic bronze medalists for Spain
Olympic medalists in handball
Medalists at the 1996 Summer Olympics
20th-century Spanish people